Various moot court awards are annually given in the Willem C. Vis International Commercial Arbitration Moot in Vienna as well as the Willem C. Vis (East) Moot in Hong Kong. The top prizes in Vienna are the Pieter Sanders Award (Best Claimant Memorandum), the Werner Melis Award (Best Respondent Memorandum), the Martin Domke Award (Best Oralist), and the Eric Bergsten Award (Winner of the Moot; known as Frédéric Eisemann Award until 2017). Honourable Mentions are also awarded for the best oralists, memoranda, and teams that qualified for the knockout stages in the oral phase.

For the competition in Hong Kong, the top prizes are the David Hunter Award (Best Claimant Memorandum; known as Eric Bergsten Award until 2017), the Fali Nariman Award (Best Respondent Memorandum), the Neil Kaplan Award (Best Oralist), and the Eric Bergsten Award (Winner of the Moot; known as David Hunter Award until 2017). Like the Vienna competition, Honourable Mentions are awarded for the best oralists, memoranda, and teams that qualified for the knockout stages in the oral phase. Up until 2016, a separate winner for the Asian Division was also declared.

Between 2020 and 2022, due to COVID-19, both Vis moots were conducted online. In-person hearings resumed for both moots in 2023.

Vis Moot in Vienna

Awards for best memoranda in Vienna 
Honourable Mentions are awarded for the best memoranda of the competition, and the Pieter Sanders Award is given for the Best Claimant Memorandum. During the first three Moots, the award was given for the Best Written Memoranda in support of the positions of Claimant and Respondent. Subsequently, the Werner Melis Award was introduced as a separate award for the Best Respondent Memorandum. Pieter Sanders was one of the founders of modern international commercial arbitration. He was one of the principal drafters of the New York Convention and the 1976 UNCITRAL Arbitration Rules. Professor Sanders was also founder of the Law Faculty of Erasmus University Rotterdam and co-founder of the  International Council for Commercial Arbitration as well as the Netherlands Arbitration Institute. The Werner Melis Award is named after an Honorary President of the International Arbitral Centre of the Austrian Federal Economic Chamber (Vienna) and Honorary Vice-President of the International Council for Commercial Arbitration.

Award for the best individual oralist during the general rounds in Vienna 

Honourable Mentions are awarded for the best oralists of the competition; the Martin Domke Award is awarded to the Best Individual Oralist. Both types of award are for the general rounds, and not elimination rounds, of the competition. To be eligible for either award, a participant must have argued at least once for the Claimant and once for the Respondent. The Martin Domke Award was named after a former adjunct professor of law at New York University and a well-known scholar of international arbitration. Professor Domke was also vice president of the American Arbitration Association for 25 years and served as editor-in-chief of the then Arbitration Journal (now the Dispute Resolution Journal). He also was the author of Commercial Arbitration, published in 1965, and The Law and Practice of Commercial Arbitration, published in 1968.

Award for winner of the moot in Vienna 
Previously the Frédéric Eisemann Award, the Eric Bergsten Award is awarded to the prevailing team in the championship round. The award is named after the founder of the moot. As the Vis has grown in the number of participating teams, the Vis has expanded from having originally only four teams advance into the elimination or knockout rounds to its current state where the top 64 of over 300 teams advance.  From 1994 to 1996, the top four teams advanced; from 1997 to 1999, the top eight teams advanced; from 2000 to 2002, the top 16 teams advanced; and from 2003 to 2007, the top 32 teams advanced. Each team that advances to the elimination rounds receives an award for Honorable Mention for Best Team Orals.

Vis Moot (East) in Hong Kong

Awards for best memoranda in Hong Kong 

Honourable Mentions are also awarded for the best memoranda of the competition; the top memoranda receive separate prizes. Between 2004 and 2016, the Eric Bergsten Award was given for the Best Claimant's Memorandum in the Vis Moot (East) held in Hong Kong. It was renamed the David Hunter Award from 2017 onward. The Fali Nariman Award is given for the Best Respondent's Memorandum.

Award for the best individual oralist during the general rounds in Hong Kong 

Honourable Mentions are awarded for the best oralists of the competition; the Neil Kaplan Award is given for the Best Oralist during the General Rounds in the Vis Moot (East) held in Hong Kong.

Award for winner of the moot in Hong Kong 

The David Hunter Award was awarded to the team prevailing in the oral rounds in Hong Kong between 2004 and 2016. From 2017 onward, it was renamed the Eric Bergsten Award. Honourable Mentions are also awarded to teams that reach the knockout stages. Up until 2016, a separate winner for the Asian Division was also declared; a selection of the highest-ranking Asian teams that failed to qualify for the knockout stages would compete within a pool in a round-robin format.

 Note: due to an alleged glitch in the scoring, teams that did not advance to Round of 32 were permitted to advance directly to the semi-final round without going through the Round of 32, Round of 16, and quarterfinal.

References

External links 
 Willem C. Vis International Commercial Arbitration Moot, Vienna (official website)
 Willem C. Vis (East) Moot, Hong Kong (official website)
 Moot Alumni Association (MAA), the Alumni Association of the Willem C. Vis International Commercial Arbitration Moot

Moot court competitions